Vice Admiral Michael Joseph Noonan,  (born 13 December 1966) is a retired senior officer of the Royal Australian Navy, who served as Chief of Navy from 6 July 2018 to 6 July 2022. He previously served as Commander Border Protection Command from 2013 to 2015 and Deputy Chief of Navy from 2016 to 2018.

Early life
Noonan was born in Melbourne, Victoria, on 13 December 1966 to Michael Joseph Noonan and his wife Valerie Jean (née Maskell). He was educated at Miami and Keebra Park State High Schools on the Queensland Gold Coast. Noonan holds postgraduate qualifications in Business Administration, Maritime Policy, Marketing Communications and International Relations from the Queensland University of Technology, Universities of Wollongong and Canberra, and Salve Regina University, respectively. He is also a graduate of the Australian Institute of Company Directors.

Noonan married Jan in 17 December 1994. Jan Noonan is also a captain in the Royal Australian Navy (RAN) and was the first woman to command an Australian vessel on active service, leading HMAS Labuan on operations in East Timor in 2000. The couple have two daughters.

Naval career
Noonan joined the RAN as a midshipman in 1984. He became Director of Sailor's Career Management in 2006, Chief of Staff in Headquarters Joint Task Force 633 in 2008 and Commodore Training (COMTRAIN) for the Royal Australian Navy and the Director-General of Operations at the Headquarters Joint Operations Command in 2009.

Noonan was awarded the Commendation for Distinguished Service on two occasions, and was appointed a Member of the Order of Australia in 2012.

Noonan went on to be Commander Border Protection Command in 2013 and Deputy Chief of Navy in 2016. On 16 April 2018, Prime Minister Malcolm Turnbull announced that Noonan would succeed Vice Admiral Tim Barrett as Chief of Navy. Noonan was promoted to vice admiral and appointed Chief of Navy on 6 July 2018.

Noonan was advanced to an Officer of the Order of Australia (AO) in the 2018 Queen's Birthday Honours.

On 6 January 2022 he was awarded the Meritorious Service Medal by Singapore's Minister for Defence Ng Eng Hen. 

on 23 June 2022 he used his senior position to allow his civilian girlfriend to board HMAS Waller where he proposed and they spent the night together in what was dubbed the "Love sub." Waller was involved with filming for an upcoming recruitment drive for the Australian Defence Force. Five days after the incident, it was announced that he was being replaced as the Chief of Navy, he retired in September 2022.

References

External links
 Biography

|-

|-

1966 births
Australian military personnel of the International Force for East Timor
Australian military personnel of the Iraq War
Australian military personnel of the War in Afghanistan (2001–2021)
Living people
Officers of the Order of Australia
Military personnel from Melbourne
People educated at Keebra Park State High School
Queensland University of Technology alumni
Royal Australian Navy admirals
Recipients of the Commendation for Distinguished Service
Salve Regina University alumni
University of Canberra alumni
University of Wollongong alumni